The Thomas Jefferson Foundation Medal in Architecture recognizes individuals for distinguished contributions to the field of architecture. The Medal in Architecture has been jointly awarded each year by the Thomas Jefferson Foundation at Monticello and the University of Virginia School of Architecture since 1966. Along with the Thomas Jefferson Foundation Medal in Law, the Thomas Jefferson Foundation Medal in Citizen Leadership, and the Thomas Jefferson Medal in Global Innovation, the awards are the highest external honors bestowed by the University, which grants no honorary degrees.

Recipients

References

External links
 

Architecture awards